"One Year Later" is a 2006 comic book storyline running through books published by DC Comics. It involves a narrative jump exactly one year into the future of the DC Universe following the events of the Infinite Crisis storyline, to explore major changes within the continuities of many different comic books within the DC Comics library.

Synopsis
Following the events of the Infinite Crisis storyline, every DC Comics series jumped ahead in-story by one year. The events of the missing year were depicted in real time in the weekly comic book series 52. The "One Year Later" storyline started in March 2006, starting the same week that Infinite Crisis #5 went to press, and before the first issue of 52. Most first issues bearing the "One Year Later" logo were the first parts of multi-issue storylines, and featured major changes to the status quo of each character, often intentionally left unexplained as these details would be filled in by the remaining issues of Infinite Crisis and the 52 series.

Numerous prominent heroes were missing or inactive for most of the year as the "One Year Later" issues commenced. Heroes known to have been gone for the missing year were Aquaman, Batman, Blue Beetle, Green Arrow, Hawkman, Martian Manhunter, Nightwing, Robin, Superman and Wonder Woman. The Flash went missing, but Jay Garrick had been protecting Keystone City in his absence.

The DC Trinity
The year-long absence of the three most prominent superheroes of the DC Comics universe—Superman, Batman and Wonder Woman—and their return to active duty were a significant part of both the "One Year Later" series and 52 series.

Superman
The Superman storyline "Up, Up and Away!", was co-written by Geoff Johns and Kurt Busiek, with art by Pete Woods (and two issues by Renato Guedes), and cover art by Terry and Rachel Dodson. The four-month, eight-part introductory story arc ran through both Action Comics #837–840 and Superman #650–653. The story primarily featured a depowered Clark Kent (having lost his powers in the climax of Infinite Crisis) using his skills as a journalist to defend Metropolis from both organized crime and Lex Luthor, newly bankrupt and disgraced due to his actions in the series 52. Gradually, however, Superman began to regain his powers, just in time to battle the embittered Luthor as he sought to inflict his revenge upon Metropolis with the help of stolen Kryptonian battle technology and redesigned versions of the Toyman and the Kryptonite Man.

Batman
In the Batman storyline, "Face the Face", written by James Robinson, with art by Leonard Kirk and Don Kramer. It ran through Detective Comics #817–820 and Batman #651–654.

It concerned Batman and Robin's return to Gotham City after a year-long absence, and their investigation of a mysterious vigilante murdering low-rank supervillains (including the Ventriloquist and the KGBeast) who appeared to be connected to Harvey Dent, who had reformed and had taken up battling crime on Batman's behalf during his absence. While Dent was not responsible for the killings (the mastermind was actually Great White Shark, who over the previous year had established himself as Gotham's reigning crime boss and the majority of the victims worked for the Penguin, who was away) the resulting stress, paranoia, and resentment of being under suspicion saw the return of his "Two-Face" persona and his self-scarring, thus returning to his life of crime. The finale also saw Bruce Wayne offer to adopt Tim Drake, the third Robin (now Red Robin), as his son following the deaths of his parents and the events of the Crisis.

As well as Two-Face, "One Year Later" also saw the return of several other significant elements of the Batman mythos that had previously been written out or retired, including the return of James Gordon as Gotham's police commissioner and Detective Harvey Bullock.

Wonder Woman
Unlike the Batman and Superman series, Wonder Woman was reintroduced with a new volume at issue one in June 2006. The introductory storyline was titled "Who Is Wonder Woman?", and it was written by Allan Heinberg with art by Terry and Rachel Dodson.

In the story, Donna Troy is depicted as having taken over the Wonder Woman title in Diana's absence, while Diana is shown to have accepted a government position at the Department of Metahuman Affairs under the alias of Diana Prince at Batman's urging. She is directed by Sarge Steel and is ironically assigned to the rescue mission of the new Wonder Woman, who has been captured by several of Wonder Woman's superpowered foes who demand that the "real" Wonder Woman be submitted to them. She is partnered on the case with a reluctant Tom Tresser, also known as Nemesis. Within the story it has been revealed that prior to her admission into the department, Diana was also photographed in the company of an Eastern mystic code-named I Ching, and that the World Court has dropped the charges against her for the killing of Maxwell Lord. The story was completed in the series' first Annual in 2007.

Storylines
 Green Lantern led an assault on the Guardians' Manhunters and their new self-proclaimed leader the Cyborg Superman, and in the process managed to free Ke'Haan, Laira, Chance, Honnu, Graf Toren, General Kreon and Boodikka, lost (or presumed dead) Green Lanterns from his time as a renegade. They then rejoined the Green Lantern Corps shortly thereafter.
 A new Aquaman (named Arthur Joseph Curry) has appeared and allied himself with King Shark and the Dweller of the Depths. The original Aquaman (Orin) has mysteriously disappeared.
 A revised Doom Patrol has debuted.
 Bart Allen becomes the new Flash.
 Captain Atom has been imprisoned within Blüdhaven by the military.
 Initially, Dick Grayson and Jason Todd both operate in New York City as Nightwing, but Jason uses lethal force. Jason eventually returns to the Red Hood identity.
 Hawkman has been missing for a year, and Hawkgirl has taken his place as St. Roch's protector.
 Jason Rusch and Lorraine Reilly now compose Firestorm instead of Jason and Prof. Martin Stein, who has mysteriously disappeared.
 Lady Shiva and Gypsy have both joined Oracle's team in Birds of Prey. Black Canary returns, and Lady Shiva takes Bethany Thorne, daughter of Matthew Thorne, the Crime Doctor as her student.
 Oliver Queen is the mayor of Star City and has not appeared in public as Green Arrow for a year.
 Cassandra Cain, under the influence of Deathstroke the Terminator, has become the new leader of the League of Assassins.
 Robin leads the Teen Titans, which now includes Cyborg, Kid Devil, and Ravager (Rose Wilson). The mysterious new Titans East is based in New York. Robin is secretly trying to re-clone Superboy, who was killed during Infinite Crisis. Beast Boy and Raven have broken up and left the team.
 Selina Kyle's friend Holly Robinson replaces her as Catwoman. Selina, now using the alias Irena Dubrovna, gives birth to a daughter named Helena.
 Supergirl and Power Girl work together as Nightwing (Power Girl) and Flamebird (Supergirl) in the bottled city of Kandor.
 The Outsiders are believed dead, but continue their work underground. The members, again led by Nightwing (Dick Grayson), are Grace, Thunder, Katana, Metamorpho, and Captain Boomerang.
 Vandal Savage crash lands back on Earth without his immortality and learns he has only 11 days to live. He seeks out Alan Scott for one last battle and fails. The clone that Savage used in his plot ends up being eaten by Savage himself, extending his life another year.
 A new Justice League takes shape with 10 members, including Superman, Batman, and Wonder Woman.
 Jaime Reyes, the new Blue Beetle, wakes up in the Arizona desert and is surprised to learn that it has been one year since the attack on Brother Eye.
 The Global Guardians have recruited new members including Jet and Gloss from the New Guardians, Freedom Beast, the third Crimson Fox, Syrian hero Sandstorm, and a new Manticore.
 Bruno "Ugly" Mannheim launches many flying energy spheres on Metropolis to try to destroy Superman. He was then learned to have grown to a colossal size. Before teleporting away, he tells Superman that he now "has a new master, more powerful than Darkseid".
 A new Justice Society of America debuts, led by Alan Scott, Jay Garrick, and Ted Grant.
 Donna Troy is the new Wonder Woman and Hercules replaces Wonder Woman as an agent of Olympus.
 "1,001 Years Later", Supergirl appears in the 31st century and is revered as a member of the Superman family. Upon her arrival, she concludes that she is dreaming and that she is not actually in the future. The Legion of Super-Heroes believes that she has merely deluded herself into thinking that she is the Supergirl of the 21st century, but nevertheless accepts her as a new member.

Cancellations
In line with of the events of Infinite Crisis and 52, DC Comics cancelled some of its long-running series, including; Wonder Woman vol. 2, The Flash vol. 2 (which was restarted after the death of Bart Allen), Gotham Central, Batman: Gotham Knights, Plastic Man, JLA, Superman vol. 2, and Batgirl.

Renaming
 Adventures of Superman has been renamed to simply Superman, restoring the original title of this series with issue #650.
 Aquaman has been renamed to Aquaman: Sword of Atlantis with issue #40, starring a new lead character.
 Firestorm has been renamed to Firestorm: The Nuclear Man from issue #23 onwards.
 Hawkman is renamed Hawkgirl from issue #50 onward.
 Legion of Super-Heroes is renamed Supergirl and the Legion of Super-Heroes starting with issue #16. The title also used a "1,001 Years Later" logo for several issues.

New series
As they are new titles, many of the following do not have the "One Year Later" to indicate a time jump since the previous issue.

Spin-offs from the Countdown to Infinite Crisis mini-series:
 Checkmate was an ongoing series spun off of The OMAC Project, with writer Greg Rucka and artist Jesus Saiz. The series ended with issue #31 in October 2008.
 Secret Six is a six-issue limited series spun off from Villains United, with writer Gail Simone and artist Brad Walker. An ongoing series began in September 2008.
 Shadowpact was launched as an ongoing series spun off from Day of Vengeance, with writer and artist Bill Willingham. It concluded in May 2008 with issue #25.

Follow-ups to Infinite Crisis:
 Blue Beetle has a new character following in the footsteps of Ted Kord, written by Keith Giffen and John Rogers, with art by Cully Hamner. The series concluded in February 2009 with issue #36.
 Crisis Aftermath: The Battle for Blüdhaven is a six-issue limited series written by Jimmy Palmiotti and Justin Grey, with art by Dan Jurgens and Palmiotti.
 Crisis Aftermath: The Spectre is a three-issue limited series written by Will Pfeifer with art by Cliff Chiang.
 Ion is a 12-issue limited series spun off from Green Lantern and Rann-Thanagar War, with writer Ron Marz and artist Greg Tocchini.

Relaunches:
 The Flash: Fastest Man Alive was started with the first seven issues written by Danny Bilson and Paul De Meo (producers of the 1990s Flash TV series) with art by Ken Lashley. With the death of the fourth Flash, Bart Allen at the hands of the Rogues in issue #13, and the subsequent return of Wally West to the DCU this title has reverted to being called The Flash, and picked up its numbering from prior to the name change. Thus The Flash #231 was released in August 2007 and ran through to December 2008 with issue #247. The title was put on hiatus prior to release of The Flash: Rebirth in April 2009. A subsequent reissuing of a new Flash title chronicling the new adventures of Barry Allen began in April 2010, but was brought to an end at issue #12 ahead of the Flashpoint DC Comics event. A new Flash title began in September 2011 as part of the DC Comics decision to relaunch 52 titles from issue #1.
 Green Lantern Corps is an ongoing series spun off from Green Lantern Corps: Recharge, beginning in April 2006. It will come to an end with issue #63 in August 2011 ahead of the DC Comics decision to relaunch it as part of 52 titles from issue #1 in September 2011.
 Justice League of America, an ongoing series spun off from JLA, began in July 2006, written by Brad Meltzer and drawn by Ed Benes. It concluded in August 2011 with issue #60 ahead of the DC Comics decision to relaunch 52 titles from issue #1 in September 2011, of which a new Justice League of America title would be a part.
 Wonder Woman, volume 3, began in June 2006 with writer Allan Heinberg and artist Terry Dodson. It will be relaunched from #1 in September 2011 as part of the DC Comics decision to relaunch 52 titles from issue #1.
 JSA was canceled with issue #87 to be replaced by a new Justice Society of America series written by Geoff Johns, with art by Dale Eaglesham and covers (and storyline co-planning) by Alex Ross.
 
Brave New World:
 DCU: Brave New World is an 80-page special comic book showcasing six of the planned new titles: Uncle Sam and the Freedom Fighters, OMAC, Martian Manhunter, Trials of Shazam!, The All-New Atom, and The Creeper. The final two pages reveal the existence of the Monitors.
 The All-New Atom was an ongoing series, beginning in July 2006, written by Gail Simone and drawn by John Byrne. It concluded in July 2008 with issue #25.
 Creeper is a six-issue limited series starting August 2006, written by Steve Niles and drawn by Justiniano.
 Martian Manhunter is an eight-issue limited series starting in August 2006, written by A.J. Lieberman and drawn by Al Barrionuevo.
 OMAC is an eight-issue limited series starting in July 2006, written by Bruce Jones and drawn by Renato Guedes.
 The Trials of Shazam! is a 12-issue limited series, featuring the entire "Marvel Family" (Captain Marvel, Mary Marvel & Captain Marvel Jr.); spun off from both Day of Vengeance and Infinite Crisis, starting in July 2006, written by Judd Winick and drawn by Howard Porter.
 Uncle Sam and the Freedom Fighters is an eight-issue limited series spun off from Crisis Aftermath: Battle for Blüdhaven, starting in August 2006, written by Jimmy Palmiotti and Justin Gray with art by Daniel Acuña. A second eight issue limited series was launched in September 2007, written by Jimmy Palmiotti and Justin Gray with art by Renato Arlem, which had some ties to the previous series.

Replacements for cancelled titles:
 Batman Confidential was an ongoing series with revolving creative teams. It concluded in March 2011.
 Superman Confidential was an ongoing series with revolving creative teams. It was canceled in April 2008.

In July 2006, most DC Comics titles wrapped up their 'One-Year Later' story lines and no longer display the 'One-Year Later' bullet on their covers.

Significant events of the lost year

Aquaman
Aquaman's mysterious disappearance was subsequently followed by the arrival of one Arthur Joseph Curry. This new Arthur's origin appears to be similar to the Golden Age 'Aquaman's. Arthur meets 'The Dweller', who has an enchanted hand similar to Orin's and has been confirmed to be the original Aquaman. 'The Dweller' also tells Arthur of his future, which seems to be describing past events involving the original Aquaman.

Freedom of Power Treaty
There is a new Freedom of Power Treaty. The specifics and structure have not been detailed, but it appears to place limits on the activities of heroes outside their nation of origin. Having broken the treaty numerous times, Hal Jordan is considered a criminal by most of the world. Only the Rocket Red Brigade, Green Lantern Hal Jordan, and the Outsiders have been confirmed to be affected by it (Green Lantern #10, 2006). The Outsiders operated illegally and underground with all current members at the time (excluding Nightwing) presumed dead by the general public. As well as this, the Chinese government has formed a superteam called the Great Ten in the intervening year, and is currently working on a supersoldier program.

Gotham City
James Gordon has returned to the role of Gotham City Police Commissioner. Although the exact details have not been revealed as yet, it is known that his return - and that of Harvey Bullock - to the GCPD follows the cracking of a major corruption case in the GCPD by Bullock. Harvey Dent, believed cured of the multiple-personality disorder/psychosis issues that created his Two-Face persona, has been in charge of keeping Gotham safe as a result of a deal with Batman.

Superboy memorials
Monuments to the fallen hero have been erected in at least two locations:
 In Metropolis, the statue depicting Superman holding an eagle dating back to his first battle with Doomsday has been joined by one of Superboy (as seen in Action Comics #837), honoring his sacrifice and actions during Infinite Crisis. 52 #1 depicts the memorial, apparently erected within only a few days of Superboy's death.
 A second statue has been erected in San Francisco, in front of Titans Tower.

Aftermath
The repercussions of One Year Later are still felt today in the DCU in a number of ways.

One of the more noticeable occurrences to come out of Infinite Crisis and One Year Later was the change in Batman's demeanor. He has become more accepting of others' opinions, is more polite, and apologizes to allies when he makes errors in judgment. This does not change his approach to crime, however. Some may argue that while he has "softened" his approach to his friends, he has hardened his approach to his enemies (i.e. forcefully throwing The Joker into a dumpster after he was shot in the head, then remarking that he "must have mistaken him for trash").

Many Silver Age components have been reintroduced to Superman and his supporting cast. The character of Mon-El, the interior design of the Fortress of Solitude, Superman starting his career by being known as a "super-boy" (sans uniform), and his teenage membership in the Legion of Super-Heroes are all recognizable Silver Age components that were not included in continuity before Infinite Crisis. The stories are also beginning to aesthetically resemble the Superman feature films by using the same exterior design for the Fortress of Solitude, as well as modeling Jor-El more after actor Marlon Brando. These changes also bring current Superman stories more in line with the television series Smallville, which incorporates many of the same elements of classic comics and the feature films.

Wonder Woman actively keeps her secret identity and has a flirtatious relationship with Nemesis, a co-worker at the Department of Metahuman Affairs. The finale of the "Who is Wonder Woman" arc established that her secret identity is now a physical as well as aesthetic transformation; as "Diana Prince", she is physically a normal human, regaining her powers only when she transforms into Wonder Woman (with a spinning effect similar to that used in the Wonder Woman television series of the 1970s).

Bart Allen's tenure as The Flash was one of the shorter-lived occurrences, as the new series starring him lasted 13 issues, the last of which included the character's death. Predecessor Wally West has since retaken the mantle of the Scarlet Speedster. Many heroes, most notably members of the Teen Titans, mourn his loss. This has also led into a subplot in DC's weekly series Countdown to Final Crisis, where many heroes are shown to be actively searching for the Rogues that caused Allen's death.

The Green Lantern Corps members that were recovered from the Manhunter homeworld of Biot still despise Hal Jordan for actions Parallax committed while in control of him, leading various personal cliques to form among certain Lanterns that question Jordan being among them. Often Jordan is defended by Green Lantern Honour Guard member Guy Gardner. The lost Lanterns proved to be valuable field Lanterns on the front lines in the Sinestro Corps War, with some of them joining the ranks of the Alpha Lanterns.

References

External links

DC One Year Later Previews: Day 1, Newsarama, February 21, 2006
DC One Year Later Previews: Day 2, Newsarama, February 22, 2006
DC One Year Later Previews: Day 3, Newsarama, February 23, 2006
Champagne’s Battle Plan: The World War III co-writer promises answers to all your 'One Year Later' questions in April’s four-issue series